A rootless cone, also formerly called a pseudocrater, is a volcanic landform which resembles a true volcanic crater, but differs in that it is not an actual vent from which lava has erupted. They are characterised by the absence of any magma conduit which connects below the surface of a planet.

Rootless cones are formed by steam explosions as flowing hot lava crosses over a wet surface, such as a swamp, a lake, or a pond.  The explosive gases break through the lava surface in a manner similar to a phreatic eruption, and the tephra builds up crater-like forms which can appear very similar to real volcanic craters.

Well known examples are found in Iceland such as the craters in the lake Mývatn (Skútustaðagígar), the Rauðhólar in the region of the capital city Reykjavík or the Landbrotshólar of South-Iceland's Katla UNESCO Global Geopark near Kirkjubæjarklaustur. Rootless cones have also been discovered in the Athabasca Valles region of Mars, where lava flows superheated groundwater in the underlying rocks.

Volcanologists witnessed the formation of a rootless cone for the first time in history during a steam explosion in connection with the first eruption of Eyjafjallajökull in March 2010.

Images

See also

 Hornito
 List of rocks on Mars
 Littoral cone
 Maar
 Volcanism of Iceland

References

External links
Pseudocraters and Mars (PDF file)
Cones and Inflated Lava Flows on Mars
video and pictures of the formation of pseudocraters at Eyjafjallajökull 2010

Volcanoes
Volcanology
Volcanic landforms